Ludwik Antoni Birkenmajer (18 May 1855 - 20 November 1929), Polish historian of science, physicist, astronomer, professor of the Jagiellonian University.

Biography 

Descended from the German family settled in Galicia (Southern Poland) during the time of the Napoleon wars, later a part of the Austrian Habsburg Empire. He was the son of Józef Herman and Petronela de domo Stefanowski. Educated in the Franz Joseph High School  (so called Gymnasium at that time) in Lvov (1865–1873), than studied physics, chemistry and mathematics at the Kraków University till 1878. Supplementary studies in Vienna (1879–1880). In 1879 he defended his Ph. D. thesis in Kraków based on the study: On general methods of integration of the algebraic and transcendental functions (in Polish:  O ogólnych metodach całkowania funkcyj algebraicznych i przestępnych). Since 1878 for nearly two decades was a teacher of mathematics and physics in the renowned agricultural school in Czernichów near Kraków. In 1897 he started his academic career at the Jagiellonian University, where he continued to work till the end of his life.
At the beginning he was an extraordinary professor, than - since 1919 – he became an ordinary professor and lecturer of the history of mathematics, physics, astronomy and physical geography, simultaneously being a Chair of the History of Exact Sciences.
In 1893 he was elected the correspondent member of  Kraków Academy of Sciences and Letters, and in 1927 became its regular member. He was one of the organizers of the Library Commission of the Academy (1901). In 1910-1913 he held the post of the secretary of its Commission for the History of Mathematical and Natural Sciences. Since 1918 the Academy was renamed into the Polish Academy of Sciences and Letters. Birkenmajer was also the member of Scientific Society in Toruń (Thorn) and of the International Astronomical Union in Oxford. In 1923 took significant part in the jubilee celebration of the 450 anniversary of  the Copernicus birth with the series of lectures presented in Kraków, Toruń, Poznań and Warsaw.

Scientific output 

He analyzed the Copernicus main work De revolutionibus orbium coelestium, and came to the conclusion that the Heliocentric Theory was created by Copernicus before he became acquainted with the Ptolemy Almagest. He also elaborated the biographical materials and records of the Copernicus life till 1500, as well discovered  - an unknown earlier - letter of the astronomer to the king Sigismund I the Old concerning the Teutonic Order. He also studied scientific output of Marcin Bylica of Olkusz, and prepared the history of geodesy and gravimetry. Prepared the scientific edition of Tito Livio Burattini Misura universale  (1897), the Practical geometry of Marcin Król (1895), as well as the Commentariolum super theoreticas planetarum of  Albert of Brudzewo (1900). Moreover in his academic interests he studied theoretical physics, astronomy, algebraic functions and geophysics. In 1883 he won the prize of the Kraków Academy in geometry for solving what would (17 years) later be known as Hilbert's third problem, and later received Swedish Order of the Polar-Star, and Polish Commander Cross of the Republic of Poland (1924).

Birkenmajer family 

Ludwik was the founder of the renown Polish family of scholars. He was married Zofia (Sophie), the daughter of Franciszek Karliński, the professor of astronomy in the Jagiellonian University, and inherited his library embracing mostly the books on mathematics and physics. They had three sons: Aleksander Ludwik (historian of culture and exact sciences, and bibliologist), Józef (poet,  interpreter and literature historian), and Wincenty (Polish philologist, teacher and renown Tatra Mountains-climber). His grandson is Krzysztof Birkenmajer (professor of geology, member of the Polish Academy of Sciences). In 2011 the Institute for the History of Science of the Polish Academy of Sciences received the name of  father and son: Ludwik & Aleksander Birkenmajer.

Selected works 

·	O rozszerzalności ciał (1876)

·	O całkowaniu algebraicznem funkcyj algebraicznych (1879)

·	O przezroczystości powietrza (1879)

·	O kształcie i grawitacyi sferoidu ziemskiego (1885)

·	Tables des syzygies, calculées à Cracovie pour l'an 1379 et 1380 : contribution à l'histoire de l'astronomie en Pologne du XIVe siècle (1890)

·	Marcin Bylica z Olkusza oraz instrumenta astronomiczne, legowane przez niego Uniwersytetowi Jagiellońskiemu w roku 1493 (1892–1893)

·	Mikołaj Kopernik. Studya nad pracami Kopernika oraz materyały biograficzne (1900)

·	Marco Beneventano, Kopernik, Wapowski a najstarsza karta geograficzna Polski (1901)

·	Nicolas Copernic (1902)

·	Niccolò Copernico e l'Università di Padova (1922)

·	Mikołaj Kopernik jako uczony, twórca i obywatel (1923)

·	Stromata Copernicana (1924)

·	Mikołaj Wodka z Kwidzyna, zwany Abstemius (1926)

·	Nicolaus Copernicus und der Deutsche Ritterorden (1937)

Source editions 

·	Tito Livio Burattini, Misura universale (1897)

·	Giovanni Bianchini, Flores Almagesti : ein angeblich verloren gegangener Traktat Giovanni Bianchini's, Mathematikers und Astronomen von Ferrara aus dem XV. Jahrhundert (1911)

·	Barthélemy Berp de Valentia, De diebus naturalibus earumque aequatione (1912)

·	Marcin Biem, Martini Biem de Olkusz Poloni nova calendarii Romani reformatio: opusculum ad requisitionem V-ti Concilii Lateranensis A. D. 1516 compositum (1918)

·	Mikołaj Kopernik, Wybór pism w przekładzie polskim (1920)

·	Mikołaj Kopernik, O obrotach ciał niebieskich i inne pisma (2004)

References

Further reading 

 Andrzej Śródka, Uczeni polscy XIX-XX stulecia. Warszawa 1994, vol. I, p. 155-157
 Paweł Tarasiewicz, Zbigniew Pańpuch, Birkenmajer Ludwik Antoni, Powszechna encyklopedia filozofii vol. I, Lublin  2000
 Władysław Horbacki, Ludwik Antoni Birkenmajer (1855-1929). Łódź 1930

External links
 Polski słownik filozoficzny, Towarzystwo Tomasza z Akwinu
 Ludwik & Aleksander Birkenmajer Institute for the History of Science Polish Academy of Sciences

1855 births
1929 deaths
19th-century Polish astronomers
20th-century Polish historians
Polish male non-fiction writers
Academic staff of Jagiellonian University
20th-century Polish astronomers
19th-century Polish historians